This is a list of programs currently, formerly, and soon to be broadcast by HGTV Canada. It includes both original programming created for the network, and programming acquired from other sources including HGTV US.

A
 The Antonio Treatment

B
 Backyard Builds
 Bang for Your Buck
 The Block
 Build a New Life in the Country
 Buy Herself
 Buy Me

C
 Canada's Handyman Challenge
 Colin and Justin's Home Heist
 Cowboy Builders

D
 Debbie Travis' Facelift
 Deck Wars
 Decked Out
 The Decorating Adventures of Ambrose Price
 Design Inc.
 Design Interns
 Design Rivals
 Designer Guys
 Designer Superstar Challenge
 Disaster DIY

E
 The Expandables
 Extreme Makeover: Home Edition

F
 Family Home Overhaul
 The Fix
 Fixer Upper
 Flipping Out
 For Rent
 Four Houses

G
Gut Job

H
 Handyman Superstar Challenge
 HGTV's Top 10
 Hidden Potential
 Holmes and Holmes
 Holmes Inspection
 Holmes on Homes
 Home by Novogratz
 Home to...
 Home to Win
 House Hunters
 House Hunters International
 House of Bryan
 How Not to Decorate

I
 I Wrecked My House
 Income Property
 Island of Bryan

J
 Junk Brothers
 Just Ask Jon Eakes

K
 Kitchen Cousins
 Kitchen Equipped

L
 Leave It to Bryan
 Location, Location, Location

M
 Making it Home with Kortney and Kenny
 Massive Moves
 May the Best House Win
 Million Dollar Contractor
 Mission: Organization
 My First Place

N
 Neat

O
 Open House Overhaul

P
 Property Ladder
 Property Shop
 Property Virgins
 Pure Design

R
 Real Estate Intervention
 Real Renos
 Relocation, Relocation
 Restaurant Makeover
 Rock Solid Builds
 Room Service
 Rooms That Rock

S
 Sarah's House
 Save My Reno
 Selling LA
 Selling New York
 The Stagers
 Summer Home

T
 Tackle My Reno
 Timber Kings
 Top Design
 Tough As Nails
 Turf War

U
 The Unsellables
 Unusually Thicke
 Urban Suburban

W
 Weekend Warriors
 World's Greenest Homes
 Worst to First

Y
 Yard Crashers

References

HGTV Canada